Georgios Pilidis (born 21 January 2000) is a Greek freestyle wrestler. He won the gold medal in the 65 kg event at the 2021 U23 World Wrestling Championships held in Belgrade, Serbia. He competed in the 65 kg event at the 2020 Summer Olympics.

References

External links
 

2000 births
Living people
Greek male sport wrestlers
Olympic wrestlers of Greece
Wrestlers at the 2020 Summer Olympics
Place of birth missing (living people)
21st-century Greek people